The 1988 Coca-Cola PBA/IBA World Challenge Cup was the 2nd staging of the PBA/IBA series hosted by the Philippine Basketball Association (PBA) and the International Basketball Association. The one-week event took place on September 18–25.

Tournament details
Two PBA basketball clubs; All-Filipino Conference champion Añejo Rum 65ers and All-Filipino Conference third placer Alaska Milkmen were joined by the IBA representative, Los Angeles Jaguars, coached by Paul Howards, and the Australian selection, Aussie All-Stars, coached by Ken Cole. Among those playing for the Jaguars were Sean Chambers, 6'2" NBA veteran Rudy White, Tran Sawyer, Quintin Stephens. The Australian All-star team had two Americans, Jerry Everett and Rick Sharp, although a third American scheduled to play, Mark Davis was unable to make the trip. The 65ers played with only one import, Bobby Parks, borrowed from Shell, while the Milkmen were reinforced by Willie Bland and Eddie Cox.

Results

Battle for third place

Finals

Romulo Mamaril came from nowhere to deliver the winning basket, struck with a lay-up in the last three seconds that shattered the 126-all deadlock and power Añejo to a 128-126 triumph over Alaska for the PBA/IBA championship. The Rum Masters led by 14 points in the third quarter but Alaska's Willie Bland rallied the Airmen back to tie the count at 97-all, a seesaw battle ensued in the final six minutes before Mamaril came through with his heroics. Añejo's Bobby Parks was named Most Valuable Player of the 2nd PBA/IBA Cup.

Philips Sardines Slam Dunk competition
Champion: Willie Bland of Alaska (144 points)
Runner-up: Sean Chambers of LA Jaguars (133 points)
Third place: Eddie Cox of Alaska (122 points)

References

PBA special conferences
IBA
1988–89 in American basketball
1988 in Australian basketball
International basketball competitions hosted by the Philippines